

Squads

Test series

Only Test

ODI series

1st ODI

2nd ODI

Records and statistics

Batting

Bowling

External links
 Series home

References 

1993 in English cricket
1993 in Sri Lankan cricket
1992-93
International cricket competitions from 1991–92 to 1994
Sri Lankan cricket seasons from 1972–73 to 1999–2000